Anderson de Oliveira Rodrigues (born 21 May 1974) is a volleyball coach and retired Brazilian volleyball player who won a gold medal at the 2004 Summer Olympics and a silver medal at the 2008 Summer Olympics.
Anderson in 2007 Serie A1 League won Most Valuable Player.

He was born in Belo Horizonte.

References

1974 births
Living people
Brazilian men's volleyball players
Volleyball players at the 2004 Summer Olympics
Volleyball players at the 2007 Pan American Games
Volleyball players at the 2008 Summer Olympics
Olympic volleyball players of Brazil
Olympic gold medalists for Brazil
Olympic silver medalists for Brazil
Olympic medalists in volleyball
Medalists at the 2008 Summer Olympics
Medalists at the 2004 Summer Olympics
Volleyball players at the 2003 Pan American Games
Pan American Games bronze medalists for Brazil
Pan American Games gold medalists for Brazil
Pan American Games medalists in volleyball
Medalists at the 2003 Pan American Games
Medalists at the 2007 Pan American Games
Sportspeople from Belo Horizonte